Psoloptera locotmemica is a moth in the subfamily Arctiinae. It was described by Felix Bryk in 1953.

References

Moths described in 1953
Euchromiina